Heinrich Hermann Robert Hartmeyer (born 19 May 1874 in Hamburg; died 13 October 1923 in Freiburg im Breisgau) was a German zoologist.

From 1892 he studied medicine and biology at the University of Bonn; from 1895 he studied at the University of Leipzig with Rudolf Leuckart and at the University of Breslau (now Wrocław in Poland) with Willy Kükenthal. In 1898 he received his PhD at Breslau.

In 1899, he conducted marine zoological studies in Messina, at Stazione Zoologica in Naples and in Rovinj. In 1900, he became a research assistant. From 1908, he was curator at the Zoological Museum of the University of Berlin.

Since 1894, he was a member of the Corps Palatia Bonn.

Works 
 1893 - H. G. Bronns Klassen und Ordnungen des Tierreichs: Bd. 3. Mollusca. Supplement. Tunicata (Manteltiere).. Die Appendicularien und Ascidien / begonnen von Osw. Seeliger, fortges. von R. Hartmeyer, Part 1 by Heinrich G. Bronn, Oswald Seeliger, Robert Hartmeyer and G. Neumann - 1773 pages
 1899 - Conspectus faunæ groenlandicæ: Pars [prima] [tertia] by Hjalmar Ditlevsen, Tage Ulrich Holten Ellinger and Robert Hartmeyer
 1899 - Die Monascidien der Bremer Expedition nach Ostspitzbergen im Jahre 1889 by Robert Hartmeyer - 70 pages
 1899 - Papers on tunicates by Robert Hartmeyer
 1900 - Memoirs on ascidians by Robert Hartmeyer
 1900 - Monascidien von ternate by Robert Hartmeyer - 12 pages
 1900 - Nachtrag zu Monascidien von Ternate by Robert Hartmeyer - 242 pages
 1901 - Holosome Ascidien (Ascidiacea holosomata). by Robert Hartmeyer
 1903 - Die Ascidien der Deutschen Sudpolar-Expedition, 1901–1903 by Robert Hartmeyer - 200 pages
 1907 - Die Fauna Sudwest-Australiens, Ergebnisse der Hamburger sud-west-australischen Forschungsreise 1905, herausgegeben von Dr. W. Michaelsen und Dr. R. Hartmeyer, Volume 1 by Wilhelm Michaelsen and Robert Hartmeyer
 1908 - Die Fauna Sudwest-Australiens V1: Ergebnisse Der Hamburger Sudwest-Australischen Forschungsreise 1905 (1908) by Johann Wilhelm Michaelson and Robert Hartmeyer
 1909 - Blattidae by Robert Shelford, Wilhelm Michaelson, Robert Hartmeyer - 142 pages
 1909 - Die westindischen Korallenriffe und ihr Tierleben by Robert Hartmeyer - 40 pages
 1909 - Mollusca, Nemertini, Bryozoa, Turbellaria, Tricladida, Spongillidae, Hydrozoa by Johannes Thiele, Robert Hartmeyer and Ludwig von Graff - 199 pages
 1909 - Nematodes, Mermithidae, Gordiidae by Leonard A. Jägerskiöld, V. Linstow and Robert Hartmeyer - 92 pages
 1910 - The terrestrial mammals and birds of north-east Greenland: biological observations by A. L. V. Manniche, Frits Johansen and Robert Hartmeyer - 236 pages
 1911 - Die Ascidien der deutschen Südpolar-Expedition 1901–1903: mit Taf. 45-57 by Robert Hartmeyer - 199 pages
 1911 - Die Appendicularien und Ascidien by Oswald Seeliger, Heinrich Georg Bronn and Robert Hartmeyer - 952 pages
 1911 - Die Fauna südwest-Australiens: Ergebnisse der Hamburger südwest-australischen Forschungsreise 1905, Volume 1 by Deutsche Südpolar-Expedition, Robert Hartmeyer - 199 pages
 1911 - Polycitor (Eudistoma) mayeri nov. sp., from the Tortugas by Robert Hartmeyer - 5 pages
 1912 - Die Ascidien der Deutschen Tiefsee-Expedition by Robert Hartmeyer - 170 pages
 1912 - Die ascidien der Danmark expedition by Robert Hartmeyer - 236 pages
 1913 - Abt. II,1 by Oswald Seeliger, Heinrich Georg Bronn and Robert Hartmeyer - 182 pages
 1913 - Revision von Heller's Ascidien aus der Adria II. Die Arten der Gattungen Microcosmus, Cynthia, Styela, Polycarpa, Gymnocystis und Molgula by Robert Hartmeyer - 37 pages
 1914 - Ascidier by Robert Hartmeyer - 1117 pages
 1915 - Alder und Hancocks Britische Tunicaten: eine Revision by Robert Hartmeyer - 39 pages
 1915 - Results of a biological survey of Blacksod Bay, Co. Mayo by M. C. Knowles and R. Hartmeyer - 72 pages
 1916 - Berichtigung zu: Clark, A. H., The Crinoids of the Museum für Naturkunde, Berlin by Robert Hartmeyer -  4 pages
 1919 - Ascidien by Robert Hartmeyer - 150 pages
 1919 - Ascidien aus dem Barentsmeer by Robert Hartmeyer
 1919 - Results of Dr. E. Mjöbergs Swedish Scientific Expeditions to Australia 1910-13: Ascidien by Robert Hartmeyer - 150 pages
 1921 - Studien an westgrönländischen Ascidien: (Ergebisse der Einsammlungen von Dr. V. Nordmann in Nordre Strømfjord, Sommer 1911 und Dr. K. Stephensen in Kvarnefjord, Bredefjord und Skovfjord, Sommer 1912) by Robert Hartmeyer - 137 pages
 1922 - Die Ascidienfauna des Trondhjemfjords by Robert Hartmeyer - 47 pages
 1924 - Ascidiacae: Part 2 by Robert Hartmeyer - 275 pages
 1924 - Ascidiacea: zugleich eine Übersicht über die arktische und boreale Ascidienfauna auf tiergeographischer Grundlage by Robert Hartmeyer - 640 pages
 1929 - Ergebnisse einer zoologischen Forschungsreise nach Westindien im Jahre 1907: ..., Volume 1 by Willy Kükenthal, Robert Hartmeyer - 234 pages
 Die Ascidien der Arktis by Robert Hartmeyer - 320 pages
 Etwas über Schreibungen von Gattungsnamen by Robert Hartmeyer
 Miscellanea ascidiologica by Robert Hartmeyer
 Neue und alte Styeliden aus der Sammlung des Berliner Museums by Robert Hartmeyer
 Nomenclator animalium generum et subgenerum
 Zur Kenntnis phlebobranchiater und diktyobranchiater Ascidien by Robert Hartmeyer and Wilhelm Michaelsen.

References 

1874 births
1923 deaths
Scientists from Hamburg
University of Bonn alumni
University of Breslau alumni
Leipzig University alumni
20th-century German zoologists